Sohu is a Chinese streaming website. Sohu started its own programs in 2011. Its first show was a short form comedy called Qian Duoduo Gets Married, which led to huge success and to the production of several other successful short form comedy shows, including Diors Man and Wonder Lady.

Original programmings

Drama 
Number of original drama shows: 39

Comedy 
Number of original comedy shows: 12

Reality

Co-productions

Exclusive distributions

National content distributions

International content distributions

References 

Sohu
Sohu
Sohu original programming